Nacogdoches High School is located in north east Nacogdoches, Texas.

Nacogdoches High School is the high school of the Nacogdoches Independent School District. It serves all of the city of Nacogdoches and most of Nacogdoches County.

History
Providing for the formal education of its youth has been important to the citizens of Nacogdoches since the first European settlers arrived in the area. Beginning during the Spanish Colonial period, the recorded history of the town is filled with references about the need for and the establishment of schools. It was not until June 10, 1903, however, that the Nacogdoches Independent School District and Nacogdoches High School had their beginnings. On that date, an election was held to incorporate the school district. The election followed a long period of discussion in the community and many editorials in the local newspaper. Prior to this election, the only education available to the children of Nacogdoches was provided by tutors, private schools, and Nacogdoches University, which was chartered by the Congress of the Republic of Texas on February 3, 1845, during the closing days of the Republic. The establishment of the University gave Nacogdoches the distinction of being "the cradle of public education in Texas".

In 1904, the buildings of Nacogdoches University and Washington Square on which they stood were deeded to the newly incorporated Nacogdoches Independent School District by the university trustees. It was these buildings, only one of which (the "Old University Building") remains, which formed the nucleus of the Nacogdoches Public Schools and Nacogdoches High School. Classes for Nacogdoches High School were held in the university buildings and a new building, which was constructed in 1904 directly in front of the main brick building of the university to house the high school classes.

In the next decade, another new building, the Rusk Building or the "Old Red Building," was added to the school complex on Washington Square. These two structures housed the high school classes and other classes until a new high school building, the "White Building," was constructed in 1939 as a WPA project during the New Deal era. Adults who were students in Nacogdoches High School at the time this building was constructed vividly remember carrying their own desks and books across campus to the new building when it was completed. This building was named the Charles K. Chamberlain Building by the Nacogdoches Independent School District Board of Trustees in 1980 in honor of Dr. C.K. Chamberlain who was the principal of Nacogdoches High School at the time the building was first occupied. The first class of graduates from this building was the Class of 1940.

During the summer of 1970, the student bodies of Nacogdoches High School and E.J. Campbell High School were merged to form a single high school for the school district, with its main campus housed in the Chamberlain and Rusk Buildings on Washington Square. The Class of 1971 was the first Nacogdoches Independent School District graduating class to include all the graduating seniors of all races represented in the district.

The Chamberlain and Rusk buildings continued to house Nacogdoches High School until the fall of 1979, when another "new" high school building was completed on the southwest corner of Loop 224 and the Appleby Sand Road at 4310 Appleby Sand Road.

Information
It is currently classified as a division 5A high school by the University Interscholastic League.

The average class size is 20-30, with about 420 students in a grade.

During the 2010-11 school year, demographics at the high school were as follows: White 33.2%, Black 28.8%, Hispanic 36.3%, Asian/Pacific Islander 1.6%, American Indian/Alaskan Native <1%.

On September 13, 2013, the Nacogdoches Dragons football team beat their longtime rival, the Lufkin Panthers, for the first time since 1992 with a score of 28 to 24.

Athletics
NHS Athletics cover a wide variety of varsity sports: cross country, football, basketball, soccer, baseball, softball, power lifting, swimming, tennis, volleyball, golf, and track & field. All perform under the name The Nacogdoches Golden Dragons. All sports participate in the University Interscholastic League 5A District 16.

Nacogdoches has a long-running rivalry with nearby Lufkin in both civic and athletic events.  The games are hotly contested, with every sport boasting a win against the Lufkin Panthers in the last three school years.

Football
Nacogdoches has a record of being beaten in football by the Lufkin Panthers for a long time. However, in the 2013-2014 football season, Nacogdoches beat their rivals 28-24. The next football season saw another win with a score of 38-35.

The 2005-2006 Football season brought with it a new coaching staff, under the direction of Head Coach Bill Harper, and the Dragon's first winning record (Overall 6-4) since 1992.

In 2006, the Dragons made it to the playoffs for the first time since 1992. However, in 2007, the Dragons missed the playoffs by failing to maintain momentum and losing the final games needed to make it into the playoffs.

On October 30, 2010, Nacogdoches High played a record setting 12 overtime football game against Jacksonville High.  The game lasted over 5 hours.

Extracurricular
Nacogdoches High School offers many extracurricular activities and clubs, including a chapter of the National Honor Society, a chapter of Key Club, a chapter of the National English Honor Society, Model United Nations, the Nacogdoches Golden Dragon Band, a choir, Student Council and many small interest clubs. Students in Nacogdoches High School are highly involved in extracurricular activities, and not many students have no involvement at all with extracurriculars.

Notable alumni
Roy Blake, Sr. – Texas legislator 
Roy Blake, Jr. – Texas legislator and son of Roy Blake, Sr.
Clint Dempsey – a soccer player who currently plays for MLS club Seattle Sounders F.C.
Kynan Forney – American football guard for the Jacksonville Jaguars of the National Football League.
Josh Denton– former college basketball player for Brigham Young University-Idaho and 2018 intramural basketball champion.
Damion James – professional basketball player, currently with the Washington Wizards.
Delvin James – former starting pitcher in Major League Baseball who played for the 2002 Tampa Bay Devil Rays.
Brandon Jones - Football player for the University of Texas in 43 career games and 35 starts and currently the Miami Dolphins
Ron Raines – actor best known for the role of Alan Spaulding on the long-running soap, Guiding Light.
Greg Roberts – American football Guard, 1978 Outland Trophy winner
Bucky Brandon - former Major League Baseball Pitcher (1966-1973)

References

Rivals.com article on the 12 overtime game

External links
 Nacogdoches High School
 Nacogdoches High School Athletics
 Nacogdoches High School Class of 1992

Educational institutions established in 1903
Schools in Nacogdoches County, Texas
Public high schools in Texas
1903 establishments in Texas